is a Ryukyuan gusuku in Tomigusuku, Okinawa. It was built in about 1400 by Ououso, then King of Nanzan, and is now a ruined castle. The castle is not far off of Highway 58.

World War II
During the Battle of Okinawa, much of the castle ruins were destroyed. In addition, 175 Japanese soldiers committed suicide near Tomigusuku Castle, rather than surrendering to the Allies.

References

Buildings and structures completed in 1400
Castles in Okinawa Prefecture